Gillespie Run is a  long 2nd order tributary to Middle Wheeling Creek in Ohio County, West Virginia.

Variant names 
According to the Geographic Names Information System, it has also been known historically as:
 Gillaspies Run
 Gillespie Creek
 Glasby Creek
 Glyspie Run

Course 
Gillespie Run rises about 0.25 miles northwest of Beham, Pennsylvania, and then flows west-northwesterly to join Middle Wheeling Creek about 0.5 miles south of Camp Giscowhego.

Watershed 
Gillespie Run drains  of area, receives about 41.3 in/year of precipitation, has a wetness index of 280.65, and is about 70% forested.

See also 
 List of rivers of West Virginia

References 

Rivers of Washington County, Pennsylvania
Rivers of Ohio County, West Virginia
Rivers of Pennsylvania
Rivers of West Virginia